Kumata Hill (‘Halm Kumata’ \'h&lm 'ku-mata\) is the partly ice-free hill rising to 552 m on the east side of Stepup Col on Trinity Peninsula in Graham Land, Antarctica.  It is surmounting Broad Valley to the north and Cugnot Ice Piedmont to the south.

The hill is named after the Kumata locality on Vitosha Mountain in Western Bulgaria.

Location
German-British mapping in 1996.

Maps
 Trinity Peninsula. Scale 1:250000 topographic map No. 5697. Institut für Angewandte Geodäsie and British Antarctic Survey, 1996.
 Antarctic Digital Database (ADD). Scale 1:250000 topographic map of Antarctica. Scientific Committee on Antarctic Research (SCAR). Since 1993, regularly updated.

Notes

References
 Kumata Hill. SCAR Composite Antarctic Gazetteer
 Bulgarian Antarctic Gazetteer. Antarctic Place-names Commission. (details in Bulgarian, basic data in English)

External links
 Kumata Hill. Copernix satellite image

Hills of Trinity Peninsula
Bulgaria and the Antarctic